Jacob's Ladder is a bridleway between Kinder Scout plateau and the hamlet of Upper Booth in the Vale of Edale, in the Derbyshire Peak District of England.

In the 18th century Jacob Marshall farmed the land at Edale Head, at the top of what became known as Jacob's Ladder. He cut steps into this steep section of the route up to the Kinder plateau. Jacob's Ladder is also a biblical term referring to the ladder to heaven which Jacob dreamt about (in the Book of Genesis).

Edale Head is the source of the River Noe (a tributary to the River Derwent), which flows down the clough (steep valley) alongside the path. At the foot of Jacob's Ladder is a gritstone packhorse bridge, with a single span which crosses the River Noe. It is a designated Grade II structure. The bridge is on an important medieval packhorse route over the Pennine moorland between Hayfield and Edale. Salt and cheese from Cheshire and cotton from the Lancashire mills were transported to the east, while coal and lead were carried to the west.

Edale Cross is a medieval wayside cross at the top of Jacob's Ladder. It marks the boundary between the three wards of Forest of High Peak: Glossop and Longdendale, and Hopedale and Campagna. The cross is a protected Scheduled Monument. The mass trespass of Kinder Scout, carried out by about 500 walkers in 1932, passed the top of Jacob's Ladder on the way from Kinder Downfall back to Hayfield, where they began the walk.

The Pennine Way long-distance footpath, from Derbyshire to Scotland, ascends Jacob's Ladder, just  from its start at Edale. The original route of the Pennine Way went up to the Kinder plateau via Grindsbrook Clough. In 1987 the Manpower Services Commission built a stone paved staircase along the path of Jacob's Ladder.

Jacob's Ladder footpath runs across land that is owned and managed by the National Trust. It is also part of the Kinder Scout protected Site of Special Scientific Interest (SSSI), which was designated as a National Nature Reserve in 2009. There are kestrels, buzzards and curlews in the valley. The trees along the hillsides include birch, rowan and alder.

Access to the foot of Jacob's Ladder can be made along the Pennine Way trail from Edale railway station or from the public car park at Barber Booth.

References 

Footpaths in Derbyshire
Peak District